During the Parade of Nations at the 2011 Pan American Games opening ceremony, held beginning at 18:00 CDT on February 14, 2011, 42 athletes bearing the flags of their respective nations led their national delegations as they paraded into Omnilife Stadium in the host city of Guadalajara, Jalisco, Mexico.

Athletes entered the stadium in an order dictated by tradition. As the host of the first Pan American Games, Argentina entered first. Mexican delegates entered last, representing the host nation. The delegations entered by Spanish alphabetical order as per Pan American Sports Organization protocols, which also happened to be the official languages of the host nation. 

The delegation from the Netherlands Antilles marched under the Pan American Sports Organization flag, because their National Olympic Committee had lost official recognition from the International Olympic Committee and the Pan American Sports Organization.

List

References

National Flag Bearers, 2011 Pan American Games